Julie M. Fenster (born November 20, 1957) is an American author of historical articles and books focusing on 19th-century events and persons.

Biography
She appeared in a TV commercial for Cheapbooks, which aired in early 2008. She is shown at a book signing for her work "Race of the Century."

In January 2006, she and co-author Douglas Brinkley released Parish Priest, a biography of Father Michael J. McGivney, the founder of the Knights of Columbus. In 2009, she published a biography of Franklin D. Roosevelt's early political advisor Louis Howe, titled FDR's Shadow: Louis Howe, the Force that Shaped Franklin and Eleanor Roosevelt. She is the co-author of Debbie Wasserman Schultz's book For the Next Generation: A Wake-Up Call to Solving Our Nation's Problems.

Notable works
Ether Day: The Strange Tale of America's Greatest Medical Discovery and the Haunted Men Who Made It (2001) 
Mavericks, Miracles, and Medicine: The Pioneers Who Risked Their Lives to Bring Medicine into the Modern Age (2003) 
Race of the Century: The Heroic True Story of the 1908 New York to Paris Auto Race (2006) 
The Case of Abraham Lincoln: A Story of Adultery, Murder, and the Making of a Great President (2007) 
FDR's Shadow: Louis Howe, the Force That Shaped Franklin and Eleanor Roosevelt (2009) 
The Spirit of Invention: The Story of the Thinkers, Creators, and Dreamers Who Formed Our Nation. New York, NY: HarperCollins, 2009. 
Jefferson's America: The Expeditions That Made a Nation. [Place of publication not identified]: Crown, 2014.

Awards
In 2003, she won The Anesthesia Foundation's 2003 Book/Multimedia Education Award for Ether Day.

References

External links 
 The Ether Controversy: Milestone in American Medicine; review/criticism;  
 Interview on The Case of Abraham Lincoln at the Pritzker Military Museum & Library
 

1957 births
Living people
American women writers
21st-century American women